Lisell Jäätma (born 19 July 1999) is an Estonian archer competing in compound events.

Early life 

Lisell Jäätma was born in Paide. Her mother is archer and trainer Maarika Jäätma and her younger brother is archer Robin Jäätma.

Career 

In 2019, Jäätma and her brother Robin Jäätma won the gold medal in the mixed team compound event at the Summer Universiade held in Naples, Italy. They won the silver medal in the mixed team compound event at the 2021 European Archery Championships held in Antalya, Turkey.

She won the gold medal in the women's compound event at the 2020 Sud de France Nimes Archery Tournament. She also won the gold medal in this event in 2021.

In 2022, she won the silver medal in the women's team compound event at the European Indoor Archery Championships held in Laško, Slovenia. She won the bronze medal in the women's compound event at the Antalya, Turkey event in the 2022 Archery World Cup. Jäätma and Robin Jäätma won the silver medal in the mixed team compound event at the 2022 European Archery Championships held in Munich, Germany.

References

External links
 

Living people
1999 births
Estonian female archers
Universiade medalists in archery
Universiade gold medalists for Estonia
Competitors at the 2019 Summer Universiade
Medalists at the 2019 Summer Universiade
Sportspeople from Paide
21st-century Estonian women